Brad or Bradley Walker may refer to:

Brad Walker (pole vaulter) (born 1981), American pole vaulter
Brad Walker (footballer) (born 1996),  English footballer
Brad Walker (rugby league), English rugby league player
Bradley Walker (musician), known as Butch Walker
Bradley Walker, attorney
Bradley Walker (singer)
Mark Walker (North Carolina politician) (Bradley Mark Walker, born 1969)
Bradley Walker, character in Bosch (TV series)

See also
Bradley Walker Tomlin (1899–1953), American painter